Trail hunting is a legal, although controversial, alternative to hunting animals with hounds in Great Britain. A trail of animal urine (most commonly fox) is laid in advance of the 'hunt', and then tracked by the hound pack and a group of followers; on foot, horseback, or both.

Background
By 2005, most forms of hunting animals with hounds had been made illegal across Great Britain, although many remain within the law in Northern Ireland. To preserve their traditional practices, most registered hunts switched to trail hunting as a legal alternative.

Trail hunting, while superficially similar to the established sport of drag hunting, was an entirely new invention in 2005 and one which hunts claim is designed to replicate the practice of hunting as closely as possible, but without the deliberate involvement of live prey.

Description
Trail hunting should not be confused with drag hunting; where hounds follow an artificial scent, usually aniseed, laid along a set route which is already known to the huntsmen. 

In trail hunting, a scent trail is laid using the 'prey' animal's urine (foxes, hares, or other animals) and deliberately laid in areas where those animals naturally occur; ostensibly to recreate the experience of chasing a real animal. The trail does not follow a pre-determined course and those controlling the hounds do not know the route in advance.

Controversy
Anti-hunt organisations claim trail hunting is a smokescreen for illegal hunting and a means of circumventing the Hunting Act 2004, which applies in England and Wales, and the Protection of Wild Mammals (Scotland) Act 2002, which applies in Scotland.

Because the trail is laid using animal urine, and in areas where such animals naturally occur, hounds often pick up the scent of live animals; sometimes resulting in them being caught and killed. 

It has also been alleged that trail hunts rarely lay an actual trail; therefore encouraging hounds to pick up live animal scent. The League Against Cruel Sports has claimed that, of 4,000 monitored hunts, someone was seen laying a possible trail in an average of around only 3% of occasions. The Malvern Hills Trust, which banned trail hunting on its land in 2021, has said that, during the monitoring of ten separate hunts, only one trail was seen being laid.

In recent years several major landowners have suspended or permanently banned trail hunting on their land.

Related sports

Drag hunting

Hounds follow an artificial scent, usually aniseed, laid along a set route which is already known to the huntsmen.

Hound trailing

Unlike other forms of hunting, the hounds are not followed by humans.

Clean boot hunting

Clean boot hunting uses packs of bloodhounds to follow the natural trail of a human's scent.

References

See also 
 Fox hunting
 Drag hunting
 Clean boot hunting
 Protection of Wild Mammals (Scotland) Act 2002
 Hunting Act 2004
 Opposition to hunting

Dog sports
Equestrian sports
Hunting
Hunting with hounds